Galhareri District is a district in the southwestern Galgaduud region of Somalia. Galhareri shares borders with Harardhere to the north, Ceeldhere to the northeast, Derri to the east, Wabho to the west, and El Buur to the south. It is the third-largest city in the Galgadud region.

, it has a population of 121,200. It is one of the oldest cities in the Galmudug State.  

This city is inhabited by the Murusade clan, especially the Habar idinle clan, and some famous people in the political arena belong to it, such as Abdirahman Yusuf Hussein Aynte the former minister of the planning of Somalia . And Abdi Ahmed dhuhulow dhegdheer and many others.

History
In the 16th century, Galhareeri was Somali's most important city in Central State. Galhareeri was one of the cities of the Murusade Clan, sub-clan Habar idinle. Later, came some other sub-clan in Murusade Like Habar Ceyne and Habar Mohamed here to learn Islam like Qura 'an and Siirah fields. At the beginning of the 19th century, it was one of the richest cities in the eastern part of Central State. The Habar Mohamed ruled the city from the 18th to the 19th century. They built the Wadeere tower, which was later burned down by the Ottomans (State). Also, the famous historical Sufi Cemetery place was damaged by the AlShabab fighters. In 1970s Galhareeri became the most important city and announced District In Galgadud by  former President SIYYAD BARRE administration.

The Murusade clans have lived in prosperity for a long time and they ruled with strict "Islamic Sharia law" under the sub-clan of Habar idinle, Murusade a sub-clans of the largest "Gorgaarte Hawiye" Ethnics..

References

Districts of Somalia

Districts of Somalia